William McLaren was a Scottish footballer who played as an inside right for Hamilton Academical, St Johnstone and Morton.

He played the bulk of his career with Hamilton, and was converted from a centre forward in his first season there after joining from junior team Shettleston with a reputation as a goalscorer. He appeared for Accies in the 1935 Scottish Cup Final which ended in a 2–1 defeat to Rangers. Later that year he saved a penalty in a match against Clyde after goalkeeper Jimmy Morgan was sent off. A notable feat a few years earlier was scoring four times in a 5–0 Scottish Football League win over Dundee United in April 1932.

References

Year of birth missing
20th-century births
Year of death missing
Footballers from Glasgow
Association football inside forwards
Outfield association footballers who played in goal
Scottish footballers
Glasgow United F.C. players
St Johnstone F.C. players
Hamilton Academical F.C. players
Greenock Morton F.C. players
Scottish Junior Football Association players
Scottish Football League players